Motona Dam is a rockfill dam located in Chiba Prefecture in Japan. The dam is used for water supply. The catchment area of the dam is 0.1 km2. The dam impounds about 1  ha of land when full and can store 77 thousand cubic meters of water. The construction of the dam was started on 1978 and completed in 1979.

References

Dams in Chiba Prefecture
1979 establishments in Japan